Murrieta Valley High School (MVHS), colloquially known as MV or Valley opened in 1990 as the first four-year comprehensive high school in Murrieta, California. The school is nestled at the base of the Santa Rosa Plateau, at the western end of the city. It is operated by the Murrieta Valley Unified School District. MVHS is a California Distinguished School, and is fully accredited by the Western Association of Schools and Colleges.

Feeder schools
 Elementary: Murrieta Elementary School, Cole Canyon Elementary School, Tovashal Elementary School 
 Junior High: Thompson Middle School

Notable alumni
Keith Berry, wrestler; professional mixed martial artist
Jorge Cordova, National Football League player
Lindsay Davenport, three-time Grand Slam tennis champion and Olympic gold medalist
Rickie Fowler, golf, PGA Tour
Kevin Padlo, professional baseball player for the Pittsburgh Pirates of Major League Baseball (MLB).
Tyler Wade, professional baseball player for the Oakland Athletics of Major League Baseball (MLB).
Patrick Wisdom, professional baseball third baseman for the Chicago Cubs of Major League Baseball (MLB).

Achievements 
The Murrieta Valley High School Robotics Program has a history of excellence. The robotics program has often qualified to compete at the World Championship level. Led by teacher Kevin Bradley, Murrieta Valley High School's robotics program won the VEX Robotics World Championships in 2012.

References

External links
 Murrieta Valley High School
 

 ▪  Murrieta Unified School District: School Boundary Maps

High schools in Riverside County, California
Public high schools in California
Murrieta, California
Educational institutions established in 1990
1990 establishments in California